Atef Mahayri (born 3 June 1952) is a Syrian wrestler. He competed in the men's Greco-Roman 90 kg at the 1980 Summer Olympics.

References

1952 births
Living people
Syrian male sport wrestlers
Olympic wrestlers of Syria
Wrestlers at the 1980 Summer Olympics
Place of birth missing (living people)
20th-century Syrian people